Amanda Brunker (born 12 June 1974) is a novelist, journalist and columnist for the Irish Sunday World tabloid newspaper, and former Miss Ireland.

After attending Mount Temple Comprehensive School she turned to modelling, entering and winning the Miss Ireland competition in 1991 when she was 17 years old.

Career
She has continued modelling, acted in the film Head Rush, had a cameo role on the former Irish soap Glenroe, been a nightclub hostess and presented her own late night TV show The Dinner Party.

She also performed at Oxegen 2011. The performance was hailed in the Irish and Estonian music press. Brunker declined on multiple offers from record companies to concentrate on her FETAC 4 course.

She was a judge on the third and final season of the All Ireland Talent Show, replacing Boyzone's Shane Lynch as the Dublin judge.

She published her first novel, entitled Champagne Kisses, on 25 June 2008, followed in June 2009 by a sequel, Champagne Babes.

She participated in season 4 of Celebrity Bainisteoir, managing Aughrim GAA Club, Wicklow.

References

External links
 Amanda's column in the Sunday World

1974 births
People educated at Mount Temple Comprehensive School
Living people
Irish female models
Irish women journalists
Miss Ireland winners
Miss World 1991 delegates
You're a Star contestants
Beauty pageant contestants from Ireland